Octavio de Sá (born 2 November 1935 in Lourenço Marques, Mozambique) was a football goalkeeper who played for Sporting Clube de Portugal Durban United. He is the father of South African international Roger De Sá.

References

1935 births
1990 deaths
Sportspeople from Maputo
Mozambican footballers
Mozambican expatriate footballers
Association football goalkeepers
Sporting CP footballers
Durban United F.C. players
Expatriate soccer players in South Africa